Krister Wemberg (born 21 February 1992) is a Norwegian footballer who plays as a defender for Bryne. He has previously played for Moss, Bodø/Glimt and Molde.

Club career

Early career
Born in Sortland, Wemberg played for Sortland IL's youth categories. In 2008, at the age of 16, Wemberg made an unsuccessful trial with Everton.

Moss FK
Wemberg appeared on the bench in late 2008, in the matches against Bryne, Nybergsund and Start. However, he could not enter in the field.

Wemberg made his debut on 26 April 2009, at the age of 17, in the victory against Notodden. In his first season at Moss, Wemberg made 23 appearances, 20 as a starter. In March 2010, Wemberg made another trial, this time with Fulham, but was unsuccessful again. In July 2010, Wemberg made his third trial with Rangers.

In the 2010 season, Wemberg played every match for Moss, all 20 of them as a starter, until he signed for Molde on 31 August 2010, and became Uwe Rösler's first signing as head coach of Molde.

Molde FK
In Molde, Wemberg playing time was reduced. He played 5 friendly matches for the club, but until May 2011 he had yet to appear in official competitions for the club. His debut came on 29 May 2011, in the heavily defeat against Haugesund. Wemberg started the game, but was replaced after 61 minutes. Wemberg gained two more matches, enough to win the 2011 Tippeligaen title.

FK Bodø/Glimt
13 January 2012 Molde announced that Wemberg would join Bodø/Glimt on a season long loan. He played 17 matches (15 as a starter, 1423 minutes overall) before returning to Molde.

Bryne FK
On 5 March 2013, Wemberg signed a contract with Bryne.

International career
Wemberg played for national team on U19 side. He made his international debut on 15 November 2009, against Andorra.

He played only one more match for U19, on 30 September 2010, against Liechtenstein.

Career statistics

Honours
Molde FK
 Tippeligaen: 2011

References

External links 
  Player profile on official club website
 

1992 births
Living people
People from Sortland
Norwegian footballers
Moss FK players
Molde FK players
FK Bodø/Glimt players
Bryne FK players
Eliteserien players
Norwegian First Division players
Association football central defenders
Sportspeople from Nordland